Pegasos Swiss Association or Pegasos is a non-profit group based in Basel, Switzerland with a minimal-bureaucracy approach to assisted suicide. (They also used to have an office in Melbourne, Australia, which is now closed). In Greek mythology, Pegasus is a  winged horse that the Pegasos association sees as symbolizing how patients speedily escape gravity on their final journey.

Origin
Pegasos Swiss Association was founded in August 2019 by Ruedi Habegger. Habegger was instrumental in the assisted suicide of famous 104-year old Australian scientist David Goodall. In its first month, the association provided four patients with lethal doses of sodium pentobarbital at their Liestal facility.

Process
While other assisted suicide organisations require reports from medical experts, Pegasos only needs them in complicated cases,  such as patients with mental and neurological diseases. Usually only an expert opinion is required for simple cases, which means less bureaucracy and delay.

The organisation has loose ties to Philip Nitschke's Exit International, and Nitschke plans to explore the use of his Sarco device in collaboration with Pegasos.

See also 
 Assisted suicide
 Dignitas (Swiss non-profit organisation)
 Exit International

References

External links
 Official website

Assisted suicide
Death in Switzerland
Non-profit organisations based in Switzerland
Organizations established in 2019